Chuprinino is a rural locality (a selo) in Alexeyevsky District, Belgorod Oblast, Russia. The population was 126 as of 2010. There is 1 street.

Geography 
Chuprinino is located 37 km south of Alexeyevka (the district's administrative centre) by road. Varvarovka is the nearest rural locality.

References 

Rural localities in Alexeyevsky District, Belgorod Oblast
Biryuchensky Uyezd